Hassan Farsam (September 27, 1932 in Tehran – February 5, 2016) was an Iranian pharmacist and medical chemist. He studied pharmacy at Tehran University and became a medical chemistry specialist in 1960. Farsam received post doctorate in Pharmaceutical Chemistry from  Paris University (1964) and University of California (1988). He was a Professor of Medical Chemistry in Faculty of Pharmacy of Tehran University of Medical Sciences. He was also a permanent member of the Iranian Academy of Medical Sciences.

References

External links 
 Hassan Farsam biography at Tehran University of Medical Sciences 

Iranian pharmacologists
Academic staff of Tehran University of Medical Sciences
University of Tehran alumni
1932 births
2016 deaths